Elephantoceras is genus of a Middle Permian ammonite belonging to the goniatitid family Pseudohaloritidae. Fossils belonging to this genera were found in China.

References 

Shouchangoceratinae 
Ammonites of Asia
Goniatitida genera
Permian ammonites